Endless Summer Vacation is the eighth studio album by American singer Miley Cyrus, released on March 10, 2023, through Columbia Records. Cyrus left RCA Records shortly after the release of her seventh studio album Plastic Hearts (2020), and began work on her follow-up studio effort after signing with Columbia in early 2021. While working on the record, she released the live album Attention: Miley Live (2022).

The lead single "Flowers" was released on January 12, 2023. It set several streaming records and spent six consecutive weeks at number one on the US Billboard Hot 100, becoming Cyrus's second chart-topping song in the country. It further topped the charts in 36 other countries. The second single, "River" was released on March 13, 2023.

Upon release, Endless Summer Vacation received positive reviews from music critics, who complimented its production, commercial appeal, and Cyrus's vocal performance. Cyrus' first performances for the album were pre-recorded for the Disney+ documentary concert special Miley Cyrus – Endless Summer Vacation (Backyard Sessions), which was also released on March 10, 2023.

Background and recording 
After ending her eight year contract with RCA Records, Cyrus signed with Columbia Records in March 2021. Her first releases with the label were a remix of the Kid Laroi's "Without You" and the live album Attention: Miley Live, released in April 2021 and April 2022 respectively. In an article published in October 2021, Billboard confirmed that Cyrus was working on her next album. The album was described as "her love letter to LA" that represents the physical and mental growth she experienced during production.

Cyrus wrote several songs with Michael Pollack and Gregory "Aldae" Hein. They were conceived only with piano, then evolving into their final versions. Pollack said that Cyrus decided to focus on songcraft before tackling the production. She worked with several producers including Kid Harpoon, Tyler Johnson, Greg Kurstin, and Mike Will Made It, the latter of whom contributed to Bangerz (2013), Miley Cyrus & Her Dead Petz (2015), and She Is Coming (2019). The album was recorded in Los Angeles.

Composition 
Endless Summer Vacation is a pop and dance-pop record, incorporating rock, country and experimental songs. Cyrus explained that the album is divided into two parts: AM and PM. AM represents "the morning time, where there's a buzz and energy and there's a potential of new possibilities", while PM represents the nighttime, which "feels like there's a slinky, seediness and kind of a grime but a glamour at the same time".

Release and artwork 
On December 16, 2022, posters with the caption "New Year, New Miley" were placed in major cities worldwide. Cyrus revealed the album title, cover, and release date on January 5, 2023. The cover was photographed by Brianna Capozzi and "fully executed by [Cyrus] without visual effects", and depicts a blonde Cyrus wearing a black one-piece swimsuit hanging from a helicopter ladder. It was compared to a similar photograph of Madonna for her coffee table book Sex (1992). The album trailer was released the same day, and "reflects the visual world that [Cyrus] has built around this very personal body of work" with a monologue and visuals that reference Los Angeles sights. Limited quantities of postcards featuring the album cover were autographed by Cyrus and offered through her website later that month. On February 27, 2023, Cyrus revealed the album's tracklist.

Endless Summer Vacation was released on both digital and physical formats on March 10, 2023, through Columbia. Red and clear vinyl copies of the album were made exclusive to Cyrus' website, and white vinyl copies were made exclusive to retailers including Target in the United States, HMV in the United Kingdom, and JB Hi-Fi in Australia.

Promotion 
Cyrus announced Miley Cyrus – Endless Summer Vacation (Backyard Sessions), a special released on Disney+ on March 10, 2023, featuring live performances and discussion about the creative process behind the album. It follows her Backyard Sessions performances series, started in 2012. Cyrus performed eight songs from the album: "Jaded", "Rose Colored Lenses", "Thousand Miles", "Wildcard", "Island", "Wonder Woman", "River" and "Flowers", as well as her 2009 single "The Climb". Rufus Wainwright joined her on a piano during the performance of "Wonder Woman".

Singles 
"Flowers", the album's lead single, was released on January 12, 2023 along with its music video, directed by Jacob Bixenman. Its demo version was released digitally on March 3, 2023. "Flowers" was met with mostly positive reception from critics, with many complimenting Cyrus' vocal delivery. It experienced widespread commercial success. It broke record as the most streamed song in a week on Spotify during both its first and second week. It spent seven weeks atop the Billboard Global 200 chart and became the first song in the chart's history to gain over 100 million streams worldwide in its first seven weeks. It topped the charts in over 35 countries, including the United States, United Kingdom, Australia, Canada, Germany and France. In the United States, it spent its six debut weeks atop the Billboard Hot 100, becoming Cyrus' second number-one single on the chart after 2013's "Wrecking Ball". In the United Kingdom, it spent its nine debut weeks atop the UK Singles Chart, becoming Cyrus' third number-one single. In Australia, it broke the record of the most streams in a song's first week of release. It spent its nine debut weeks atop the ARIA Singles Chart, becoming Cyrus' first number-one single.

"River" was released as the album's second single on March 13, 2023, with a music video being released March 10.

Critical reception 

At Metacritic, which assigns a weighted mean rating out of 100 to reviews from mainstream critics, the album received an average score of 79, based on 15 reviews, indicating "generally favorable reviews". Rolling Stone Brittany Spanos called it Cyrus' "sharpest, most independent album yet" and "a powerful artistic statement, focused and clear-eyed as Cyrus seems to have found herself in her thirties". Maura Johnston of the same outlet wrote that the album "feels like a recap of her career's 15-plus years, with Cyrus breezing through genres with the ease of a well-seasoned tourist." Helen Brown of The Independent called it a "lovely long bask in Cyrus's maturing talent." According to Nick Levine of NME, the album "may appear subdued by [Cyrus'] standards, but it remains remarkably intriguing" and "feels like an accurate reflection of who she is as an artist – and a person – in 2023." Emily Swingle of Clash believed that "while previous releases have been Cyrus attempting to don the outfit of another artist she admires, this release feels like she is fully embodying her own skin – this is a release that aims for timelessness in its own right, allowing the true, unfiltered Miley Cyrus to step into the sunlight." 

The Daily Telegraph Neil McCormick wrote "there is much to be admired in Cyrus's defiant will to keep messing about on pop's more eccentric fringes." Mary Siroky of Consequence called the album "cohesive without feeling repetitive", adding that "that sort of plain-spoken storytelling might have made for a good record; Cyrus' vocals take things further into the territory of greatness." Chris Willman of Variety described it as "a fairly unpretentious pop record that has some stylistic micro-shifts that don't announce themselves too proudly or loudly," noting that it balances "mellow gold and dance-pop." David Smyth of Evening Standard felt that "the strength of Cyrus is suiting her mighty voice to so many styles, on an album where even those with the shortest attention spans should find a new favourite". Alexis Petridis of The Guardian opined Cyrus "has delivered a hazily atmospheric album that plays to her provocative strengths." Heather Phares of AllMusic praised Cyrus's growth both as a vocalist and a songwriter, and wrote, "this is a mature album in the best sense of the word; like a good relationship, it's smooth, but not dull, grounded in resilience and self-love." Vulture Craig Jenkins opined the album "showcases a more unified and refined version of Miley," feeling that "the sound is pliable and chewy, and the lyrics are unpretentious."

In a mixed review, Sal Cinquemani of Slant Magazine complemented Cyrus' vocal performance, but criticized "nondescript lyricism." For David Cobbals of The Line of Best Fit, Endless Summer Vacation "is a good album with each track deserving of a listen, but in the same breath, the majority of them aren't worthy of a replay either." Pitchfork Shaad D'Souza called it "edgeless and synthetic." Mark Richardson of The Wall Street Journal felt that it "boasts several songs that rank among her best", but criticized its second half, which "reveals the limitations of Ms. Cyrus's small-plate method of construction." Los Angeles Times Mikael Wood was critical of the album's lyrics, however opining that "[Cyrus'] singing is vivid enough on Endless Summer Vacation to make up for some mushy songwriting."

Commercial performance 
Endless Summer Vacation debuted at number three on the US Billboard 200, earning 119,000 album-equivalent units, including 55,000 pure album sales. It is Cyrus's 14th US top-10 album, and her biggest week by units since Billboard began calculating them in December 2014. 

In the United Kingdom, Endless Summer Vacation debuted atop the UK Albums Chart, becoming Cyrus' second number one album after 2013's Bangerz. In Germany, it debuted at number two of the GfK Entertainment chart, becoming the highest charting Cyrus' album.

In Australia, Endless Summer Vacation debuted atop the ARIA Album Charts, becoming Cyrus' first number one album since Bangerz. In New Zealand, it debuted at number one of the Official New Zealand Music Chart, becoming her second number one album after 2009's Hannah Montana: The Movie soundtrack. It also debuted at number 1 in The Netherlands, making it her first number 1 in the country.

Track listing 

Sample credit
"Muddy Feet" contains elements of "Starving for Love", performed by Ella Washington.

Credits and personnel 
Credits adapted from Tidal, Pitchfork and the liner notes.

Locations
 Recorded at:
 The Cave, Nashville (3)
 Coffer Family BBQ, London (5, 9)
 Dr. Preuss Studios, Los Angeles (6)
 Larrabee Sound Studios, Los Angeles (4, 6, 11, 12, 13)
 No Expectations Studios, Los Angeles (2)
 The Ribcage, Los Angeles (8)
 Ridgemont High, Los Angeles (1, 4, 7, 10, 12)
 Ridgemont Studios, Los Angeles (3)
 Mixed at Windmill Lane Studios, Dublin
 Mastered at Sterling Sound, Edgewater

Musicians

 Miley Cyrus – vocals (all tracks), vocal percussion (1, 4)
 Jamie Arentzen – harmonica (4)
 James Blake – synthesizer (8)
 BJ Burton – drum machine, guitar, synthesizer (11)
 Brandi Carlile – vocals (4)
 Matt Chamberlain – tom-toms (11)
 Jonny Coffer – bass guitar, synthesizer (5, 9); keyboards, percussion, programming (5); guitar, piano (9)
 Keyon Harrold – trumpet (8)
 Ivan Jackson – horn (7)
 Tobias Jesso Jr. – keyboards (4)
 Josh Johnson – saxophone (3)
 Tyler Johnson – electric guitar (1), keyboards (1, 4), synthesizer (1, 3, 4, 7, 10), drums (4); bass guitar, drum machine, vocals (7)
 Kid Harpoon – bass guitar, synthesizer (1, 3, 4, 7, 10, 12); drums, guitar (1, 3, 4, 7, 10); percussion (1), acoustic guitar (3), piano (3, 4); drum machine, vocals (7)
 Greg Kurstin – acoustic guitar, bass guitar, drums, electric guitar, keyboards, percussion, synthesizer (2)
 Mike Will Made It – drums (4, 8); piano, synthesizer (9)
 Jay Moon – programming (5), guitar (9)
 Rob Moose – strings, viola, violin (1)
 Maxx Morando – all instruments (6); bass guitar, drums, keyboards, synthesizer (8)
 Michael Pollack – keyboards (1, 13), piano (12)
 Buddy Ross – keyboards (11)
 Jesse Shatkin – bass guitar, drum machine, keyboards, synthesizer (8); vocals (9)
 Doug Showalter – keyboards (1)
 Sia – vocals (9)
 Jake Sinclair – guitar (5)
 Aaron Steele – drums (3)
 Alex Sutton – bass guitar, guitar (11)
 Max Taylor-Sheppard – bass guitar, drum machine, drums, keyboards, synthesizer (8)
 Emi Trevena – piano (4)
 Zwiffa – piano, synthesizer (9)

Production

 Miley Cyrus – executive production
 Julian Burg – engineering (2)
 BJ Burton – production (11)
 Jonny Coffer – production (5, 9)
 Samuel Dent – engineering (8)
 Pièce Eatah – engineering (4, 6, 11, 12, 13)
 Craig Frank – engineering (13)
 Paul Hager – engineering (13)
 Tyler Johnson – production (1, 3, 4, 7, 10, 12)
 Stacy Jones – engineering (13)
 Kid Harpoon – production (1, 3, 4, 7, 10, 12)
 Greg Kurstin – production, engineering (2)
 Joe LaPorta – mastering
 Nick Lobel – engineering (3, 10)
 Mike Will Made It – production (4, 8, 9)
 Jay Moon – production (5)
 Maxx Morando – production (6, 8), engineering (6)
 Brian Rajaratnam – engineering (1, 3, 4, 7, 10, 12)
 Jesse Shatkin – production (8, 9)
 Mark "Spike" Stent – mixing (1–12)
 Max Taylor-Sheppard – production (8)
 Emi Trevena – engineering (4)
 Matt Tuggle – engineering (2)
 Jerome Williams – production (9)
 Matt Wolach – engineering assistance (1–12)
 Zwiffa – production (9)

Design
 Miley Cyrus – concept
 Jacob Bixenman – creative director
 Brianna Capozzi – photography
 Brent David Freaney – art direction
 Savannah Ioakimedes – art direction
 Sophia Marinelli – art direction
 Brendan Walter – additional art direction

Charts

Release history

References 

2023 albums
Albums produced by Greg Kurstin
Albums produced by Kid Harpoon
Albums produced by Mike Will Made It
Tyler Johnson
Columbia Records albums
Miley Cyrus albums